The Marriott's Way is a long-distance footpath, cycle-path and bridleway in north Norfolk, England, between Norwich and Aylsham via Themelthorpe. It forms part of the National Cycle Network (NCN) (Route 1) and the red route of Norwich's Pedalways cycle path network. It is open to walkers, cyclists and horse riders. Its total length is 24.6 miles (39.5 km). It has a mixture of surfaces: tarmac, compacted gravel and earth. The name of the route originates from the chief engineer and manager of the Midland and Great Northern Joint Railway (M&GNJR), William Marriott, who held the position for 41 years.

Railway history 

The path uses the trackbeds of two former railway lines: from Norwich to Themelthorpe and from Themelthorpe to Aylsham. The Themelthorpe to Norwich line was built in 1882 by the Lynn and Fakenham Railway Company, which was taken over by the M&GNJR in 1893 as part of a line that ran to Melton Constable; this line gave a through route to the Midlands. The Themelthorpe to Aylsham line was completed in 1893 by the Great Eastern Railway to provide a link to its other lines at Wroxham and County School, close to North Elmham. 
The lines were never profitable. Freight services were largely based on farm products and the line closed to passenger traffic in 1959.

In 1960, the two lines were joined by the so-called Themelthorpe Curve, believed to be the sharpest bend on the British Rail network. Its construction was to maintain the important movement of concrete products from Lenwade railway station; once production ceased in 1985, the line was closed.

Route 

At Norwich, the path begins to the north of the Barn Road and Barker Street Inner Ring Road roundabout; much of this area was part of the former Norwich City railway station. The path, which is also known as the Railway Path, follows approximately the course of the River Wensum which forms a boundary with the  Train Wood. 

After crossing a footbridge, the industrial landscape gives way to the water-meadows of the Sweetbriar Road Meadows before crossing the Wensum over the A frame bridge at Hellesdon. Travelling in a northerly direction from the junction of Marlpit Lane and Hellesdon Road, through the site of the former Hellesdon railway station, the way soon crosses the tiny River Tud at Costessey. The tree-lined River Wensum can be seen to the east, as the path passes through the open country side of the Wensum Valley. The river is crossed by means of an A-frame bridge (there are only three in Norfolk), before arriving at Drayton. The original Drayton railway station is now an industrial estate; the path follows a gravel path before crossing a minor road and entering a deep cutting to cross the busy A1067 road, close to Taverham. To the west is Thorpe Marriott, a large housing estate built in the late 20th century.

The tranquil path passes through extensive mixed woodland of the Mileplain plantation to cross the Wensum below Attlebridge. To the east of the way, the circular Winch's Way can be accessed which links to the Swannington and Alderford commons. After reaching a country lane, the privately-owned former Attlebridge railway station can be viewed; the way can be accessed close to a car park and picnic area. After passing through birch woods, the large industrial estate of Lenwade can be seen to the west of the way and water filled gravel pits to the east. 

Crossing the Wensum for the last time, and close to the former Lenwade railway station which is now privately owned, and on to Whitwell railway station.
The (NCN) leaves Marriott's Way to follow a short cut along quiet lanes to Reepham. The way carries on to Themelthorpe and follows the curve to the important stop of Reepham railway station, where the preserved station and engineering shed can be found. Following an easterly course, the path passes close by to the village of Cawston on the B1145 road and then crosses the B1149 road. To the north, the way links to Blickling Hall via Weavers Way before reaching the end of the trail at Aylsham; directly opposite is Aylsham railway station and Bure Valley Path, a walking and cycling route.

Ecology 
While the railway line was in use, trackside vegetation would have been partly controlled. The vegetation would have been cut regularly or sprayed with herbicides, so that trains were not obstructed and to lessen the risk of fire. When the railway closed, such management ceased and a wide variety of plants colonised the track; this has made it the diverse habitat for wildlife that it is today.

Today

In the Wensum Valley, immediately above the flood plain between Hellesdon and Drayton, over 100 species of vegetation have been recorded including hawthorn, guelder rose, wild rose, blackthorn, scrub oak, gorse and broom. Many wild flowers can be found such as shepherd's purse, ox-eye daisy, white campion and meadow saxifrage. Closer to the river, the soil becomes heavier and wetter and vegetation includes alder, elder, marsh marigold and willow.

To the north of Drayton, the way passes over a variety of soil types. On the chalky soils, typical plants found are the sycamore, birch and chalk grassland species such as wild carrot, self heal, bird's-foot-trefoil, knapweed and mullein. On the sandy soils bracken, birch and gorse are the more dominant species. Also of note are lichens, which are colonising many of the concrete structures and bridges along the track. The way is an important area for insects, birds and small mammals because of the variety of wild plants that are found.

Public works of art 

Several concrete public works of art can be seen along the way, as a constant reminder of the line's connection with the concrete industry and of its last days as a freight line, carrying concrete products. Also on view are hand crafted benches and places to rest; many of these memorials are to cyclists and other way users.

The route is marked by steel benches, fabricated from flat-bottomed rail at intervals of 1 mile starting from the site of Norwich City station. Each bench is to a different design, often with the rail twisted or bent, but always with a flat length at sitting height.

Public access 

Apart from the main trailheads at Norwich and Aylsham, the trail can be accessed at various points throughout its length.

Marriott's Way gallery

See also
 Official Norfolk Trails website
 Recreational walks in Norfolk

References

External links 
 Norfolk County Council
 Sustrans
 Horse riding
 Peter Boggis-Marriott's Way
 Winch's Way
 Norwich and Norfolk Naturalists' Society

Norwich
Footpaths in Norfolk
Long-distance footpaths in England
Rail trails in England